Lafia is a town in North Central Nigeria. It is the capital city of Nasarawa State and has a population of 330,712 inhabitants according to the 2006 census results. It is the largest town in Nasarawa state.

History
Lafia, also known as Lafian bare-bari, is the capital city of Nasarawa State, central Nigeria. Founded by Muhammadu Dunama in late 17th century on the site of a Koro (Migili) village. The indigenous Koro migrated southwards to Agyaragu, Anise etc. The town now has its 17th Emir in the person of Hon. Justice Sidi Bage Muhammad I JSC rtd. Lafia became the capital of a prominent local chiefdom in the late 19th century. During the rule of Mohamman Agwai (1881–1903), the Lafia market became one of the most important in the Benue Valley, and a trade route was opened to Loko (56 mi [90 km] southwest), a Benue River port. In 1903 the British, who controlled Northern Nigeria recognized Chief Musa as Lafia's first emir. The emirate formed the major part of the Lafia Division of Benue province. In 1967 the town became part of Benue-Plateau state, and in 1976 it was allocated to Plateau state.
Lafia is populated mainly by the Eggon, Alago, Kanuri, Aho and Koro. It also has large populations of Igbo, Hausa, Mwaghavul settlers amongst other tribes. This is due to the hospitable nature of the indigenes and has made the city a miniature Nigeria.

Modern Lafia aside from being an administrative and educational centre, it is also a collecting point for sesame seeds, soybeans, and is a trading centre for yams, sorghum, millet, and cotton. Besides farming, cotton weaving and dyeing are traditionally important activities of the town's inhabitants. Livestock farming is also a prominent activity especially amongst the Fulani herdsmen.

The two royal families of Ari and Dallah Dunama of the Kanuri people (Bare-Bari) are the ruling houses of the Lafia Emirate. The current Emir is Sidi Bage, from the Dallah Dunama royal family. He succeeded the longest reigning Emir, HRH Isa Mustapha Agwai I (1976–2019).

Institutions
Lafia is home to the Federal University of Lafia, Nasarawa State University Faculty of Agriculture Lafia Campus, Isa Mustapha Agwai I Polytechnic Lafia, School of Nursing And Midwifery, School of Health Technology LAFIA,  College of Agriculture Lafia, and a study centre of the National Open University of Nigeria. It has a large number of primary and secondary schools.
The St Williams Cathedral, situated along Jos Road, is the headquarters of the Lafia diocese and still under construction.

It is situated on the trunk railway from Port Harcourt and on the main highway between Makurdi and Jos. The population per the 2006 census in Lafia local government area was estimated as 330,712.

Sports
Lafia is the location of Nasarawa United, a football club whose stadium is Lafia Township Stadium.

Transportation
Lafia is served by the main narrow gauge railway from Port Harcourt.

See also
 Railway stations in Nigeria

References

 
Local Government Areas in Nasarawa State
State capitals in Nigeria